Comandante Luiz Gonzaga Lutti Regional Airport  is the airport serving Avaré and Arandu, Brazil.

It is operated by Rede Voa.

History
The airport was commissioned in 1990.

On July 15, 2021 the concession of the airport was auctioned to Rede Voa, under the name Consórcio Voa NW e Voa SE. The airport was previously operated by DAESP.

Airlines and destinations
No scheduled flights operate at this airport.

Access

See also
List of airports in Brazil

References

External links

Airports in São Paulo (state)
Airports established in 1990
1990 establishments in Brazil